Presidential elections were held in Transvaal in 1893. The result was a victory for Paul Kruger, although there were concerns that agents of Kruger had manipulated the electoral roll.

Results

References

Elections in Transvaal
1893 elections in Africa
1893 in the South African Republic
1890s in Transvaal